Fipa or FIPA may refer to:

Fipa
Fipa people, an ethnic and linguistic group in Tanzania, Africa
Fipa language

FIPA
Familial intestinal polyatresia syndrome, a rare hereditary disease
Familial isolated pituitary adenoma, a hereditary disease associated with multiple endocrine neoplasia type 1 and Carney complex
Federation Internationale des Producteurs Agricoles (International Federation of Agricultural Producers), a defunct international organization for farm organizations
Festival International de Programmes Audiovisuels, an award program based in France for audiovisual productions from around the world in the French language
Foreign investment promotion and protection agreement, any of numerous investment agreements between Canada and other countries
Foundation for Intelligent Physical Agents, an international organization for computer software standards for agent oriented systems
Florida Information Protection Act, a 2014 Florida state law governing privacy rules for entities handling personal information
Fixed-income performance attribution, methods for measuring the performance of fixed-income investment portfolios